The 2007 Maldives FA Cup, was the 20th edition of the Maldives FA Cup.

Preliminary rounds
S.C. Veloxia, Red Line Club, Huraa, 8 Degree, Mifaharu, VB Sports Club, B.G. Sports Club, Hithadhoo Youth Wing, Club Teenage, Club Eagles, Vyansa and Hurriyya SC played in the preliminary rounds.

Quarter-finals

Semi-finals

Third place play-off

Final

References

 Maldives FA Cup 2007 at rsssf.com

External links
 Maldives FA Cup Official page at Facebook

Maldives FA Cup seasons
FA Cup